Pete Johnson was a music critic for the Los Angeles Times in the 1960s before being replaced by Robert Hilburn in 1970. In 1969, he wrote The History of Rock and Roll and appeared in another rockumentary, the Pop Chronicles.

In writing The History of Rock and Roll documentary, Johnson said: "I included nearly every record I ever rem[em]ber hearing".

After his work at Los Angeles Times, Johnson was editorial director of Circular, a promotional magazine published by Warner Bros.

Sample reviews
The Doors
The Grateful Dead
Steve Winwood
The Band

External links
History of Rock and Roll Demo
Pop Chronicles interviewed Johnson on 11.15.1967; he appears in shows [ 5, 8, 12], [ 35], [ 44, 45, and 50].

References

American music critics
Los Angeles Times people
Rock critics
Living people
Year of birth missing (living people)